Biswanath is an Indian name and it may refer to 
 Biswanath Basu, Indian actor
 Biswanath Chowdhury, Indian politician
 Biswanath Das, Indian politician
 Biswanath Halder, Criminal
 Biswanath Mukherjee, Academic
 Biswanath Pattnaik, Indian activist
 Biswanath Chariali, City in Assam
 Biswanath district, in Assam
 Biswanath (Vidhan Sabha constituency), in Assam